Bavayia sauvagii, also known commonly as Sauvage's bavayia and Sauvage's New Caledonian gecko, is a species of lizard in the family Diplodactylidae. The species is endemic to New Caledonia.

Etymology
The specific name, sauvagii, is in honor of Henri Émile Sauvage, who was a French paleontologist, ichthyologist, and herpetologist.

Geographic range
B. sauvagii is found on Grande Terre, Île des Pins, and Maré Island including their neighboring islets in New Caledonia.

Habitat

Reproduction
B. sauvagii is oviparous.

References

Further reading
Boulenger GA (1883). "On the Geckos of New Caledonia". Proceedings of the Zoological Society of London 1883: 116-130 + Plates XXI-XXII. (Lepidodactylus sauvagii, new species, p. 122 + Plate XXII, figures 5, 5a).
Rösler H (2000). "Kommentierte Liste der rezent, subrezent und fossil bekannten Geckotaxa (Reptilia: Gekkonomorpha)". Gekkota 2: 28-153. (Bavayia sauvagii, p. 60). (in German).

Bavayia
Reptiles described in 1883
Taxa named by George Albert Boulenger